Builders of the Future is the eighth studio album by American rock band Powerman 5000. Produced by Evan Rodaniche, Spider One and Nick Quijano, it was released on May 27, 2014, and is the first composition that the band released through T-Boy Records and Universal Music Enterprises. The album became available for preorder starting March 25, 2014. The album sold around 4,200 copies in its first week of release, while debuting at position No. 63 on the Billboard 200 chart.

Reception

In their review, Blabbermouth.net gave Builders of the Future a rating of 7.5 out of 10, saying the album is "primarily about chasing an adrenaline rush".

Track listing

Personnel

Band members
Spider One – vocals
 Nick Quijano – guitars
 Gustavo Aued – bass
 Adrian Ost – drums

Additional musicians
 Evan Rodaniche – additional guitar
 DJ Rattan – additional drums

Production
Evan Rodaniche, Spider One – producers
Evan Rodaniche – engineers, mixing
Mister Sa Shearon – album artwork

Chart history

Singles

References

External links

Powerman 5000 albums
2014 albums